Vietti Brynolf Nykänen (15 June 1884 St. Petersburg – 6 October 1951) was a Finnish architect, writer and politician. 

Nykänen's parents were a goldsmith who owned a workshop in St. Petersburg from 1880 to 1917 and Fabergé's foreman Gabriel Nykänen (1854–1921) and Henrika (Hinni) Juhanantytär Tuomala Öhberg (1858–1934), who owned a sewing shop in St. Petersburg. Of the nine children, four died young. Vietti Nykänen's younger brother Sulo Nykänen became known during the Finnish Civil War as the "Hangman of Jaala".

He graduated from the Vyborg Real Lyceum in 1903 and graduated as an architect in 1907. Nykänen worked as an architect and independent builder in Finland, Germany and Russia. At the beginning of the 20th century, Nykänen was bringing theoretical know-how in reinforced concrete technology to Finland together with architect GE Asp and engineer Otto Weyerstall.

Nykänen took part in the founding of Vyborg White Guard in January 1918 and served as its chief of staff in the spring 1918 civil war. Vietti Nykänen also participated in the Estonian War of Independence among Finnish volunteers. He was later also politically active. In the early 1930s, Nykänen belonged to the National Socialist Union of Finland until he quarreled with the organization and in March 1933 founded a new "Stormers" party. In the autumn of 1933, Chairman Nykänen got into disputes with his party colleagues. The opposition accused Nykänen of autocracy, and disappointed supporters left the party, setting up their own organization "Stormtroopers". In 1934, Nykänen joined the ranks of Patriotic People's Movement. During the Continuation War, he was active in the National Socialists of Finland. In 1948, Nykänen was elected vice-chairman of the Radical People's Party.

In 1938, Nykänen, together with Vihtori Herttua and journalist Arvo Kokko, planned a far-right coup, which was to take place on 16 May 1938 in connection with the 20th anniversary parade of the War of Independence. The coup aimed at ousting Cajander's Social Democrat-Agrarian government was to be led by civil war veteran's organisation Front Soldier League, after Carl Lindh, president of the union, had been ousted and "foreign-language and pro-Masonic" forces had been removed from the organisation's board. The planners of the coup project planned Antti Isotalo as the new chairman of the union. However, the coup was aborted.

Buildings designed by Nykänen 
 As. Oy Kaarinankatu 2, Turku 1926–1927
 Lönnrotinkatu 26, Helsinki 1929

Writings
Huonerakennusalalla esiintyvistä tukirakenteista: rakennusteknillinen tutkielma. Helsinki: Rakentajain kustannus oy, 1930.
Lyhyt rautabetoniopas. Helsinki: Otava, 1913.
Nykyaikaisia uimahalleja. Helsinki: Akateeminen kirjakauppa, 1926.
Rautabetoni: pääpiirteinen esitys sen synnystä, ominaisuuksista, teoriiasta ja käytäntötavoista. Helsinki: Otava, 1911.
Suomen uusi tie. Helsinki: Kustannustoimisto Rivi, 1942.

Under pseudonym U. Olavi Keso:

Laukolain juttu. Suomen sotilas, Helsinki, 1928
Luomme nyt mahtavan, suuren Suomen, Helsinki, 1943

References

Finnish architects
1884 births
1951 deaths
Architects from Saint Petersburg
Finnish Nazis
Finnish writers
People of the Finnish Civil War (White side)
Nazi politicians
Nazis from outside Germany